Aero Feliz (English: Happy Air) was a passenger airline that operated in the Mexican Republic from 1990 until 1992. It is notable for being one of the first charter, low-cost airlines in Mexico.

Destinations
The airline flew from their base at Puerto Vallarta to domestic destinations within Mexico, such as Mexico City, Guadalajara, and international destinations including Dallas-Fort Worth and Oakland.

References

Airlines established in 1990
Airlines disestablished in 1992
Defunct airlines of Mexico
1990 establishments in Mexico
1992 disestablishments in Mexico